Angelo Filippetti (1866–1936) was an Italian Socialist Party politician and esperantist. He was mayor of Milan.

References

1866 births
1936 deaths
19th-century Italian politicians
20th-century Italian politicians
Mayors of Milan
Italian Socialist Party politicians
Italian Esperantists